Returnal may refer to:

 Returnal (album), a 2010 album by Oneohtrix Point Never
 Returnal (video game), a video game for the PlayStation 5